Deathstroke (Slade Joseph Wilson)  is a supervillain appearing in American comic books published by DC Comics. Created by Marv Wolfman and George Pérez, the character debuted in The New Teen Titans #2 in December 1980 as Deathstroke the Terminator. 

He is usually depicted as being among the deadliest and most expensive assassins in the DC Universe and is a prominent enemy of several superhero teams, most notably the Teen Titans, the Titans, and the Justice League. He is also a prominent adversary to individual heroes such as Dick Grayson (as Robin and later Nightwing) who has been depicted at times as his archenemy, Batman, and Green Arrow. Deathstroke is also the father of Jericho, two iterations of Ravager (Grant and Rose Wilson), and Respawn. A premier assassin, Deathstroke often comes into conflict with both members of the superhero community and his family, the latter whom he struggles to connect with.

The character was ranked the 24th Greatest Villain of All Time by Wizard magazine and the 32nd Greatest Comic Book Villain of All Time by IGN. He has been substantially adapted into various forms of media, including several Batman-related projects; and the Teen Titans animated series, where he is voiced by Ron Perlman. In live-action, Deathstroke has been portrayed by Manu Bennett in The CW's television Arrowverse show Arrow; by Esai Morales in the second season of the DC Universe series Titans; and by Joe Manganiello in the DC Extended Universe film Justice League and its director's cut.

Publication history
"Deathstroke the Terminator" was created by Marv Wolfman and George Pérez, and made his first appearance in The New Teen Titans #2 in December 1980. Christopher J. Priest said:

Due to his popularity, Deathstroke received his own series, Deathstroke the Terminator, in 1991. It was retitled Deathstroke the Hunted for issues #0 and #41–45; and then simply Deathstroke for issues #46–60. The series was cancelled with issue #60. In total, Deathstroke ran for 65 issues (#1–60, plus four Annuals and a special #0 issue).

Following his injury in DC Universe: Last Will and Testament, Deathstroke appears in one of the four Faces of Evil one-shots, written by David Hine. Hine has explained that the series is part of the setup for future stories: "All of the characters in this 'Faces of Evil' series were selected for their potential as major players in the coming year."

Even though the character of Deathstroke the Terminator predates James Cameron's film The Terminator by four years, the Slade Wilson character is now simply called Deathstroke, even though he was initially introduced as "Deathstroke the Terminator" in his first appearance and usually referred to only as "the Terminator" (and as "Termy") by other characters for decades. The full title has not completely fallen out of use, having been referenced as recently as Justice League Elite.

Fictional character biography
Slade Wilson was 16 years old when he enlisted in the United States Army, having lied about his age. After participation in the Korean War, he was assigned to Camp Washington where he had been promoted to the rank of major. In the early 1960s, he met Captain Adeline Kane, who was tasked with training young soldiers in new fighting techniques in anticipation of brewing troubles taking place in Vietnam. Kane was amazed at how skilled Slade was and how quickly he adapted to modern conventions of warfare. She immediately fell in love with him and realized that he was without a doubt the most able-bodied combatant that she had ever encountered. She offered to privately train Slade in guerrilla warfare. In less than a year, Slade mastered every fighting form presented to him and was soon promoted to the rank of lieutenant colonel. Six months later, Adeline and he were married and she became pregnant with their first child. The war in Vietnam began to escalate and Slade was shipped overseas. In the war, his unit massacred a village, an event which sickened him. He was also rescued by SAS member Wintergreen, to whom he would later return the favor.

Chosen for a secret experiment, the Army imbued him with a drug that allowed him to utilize and use up to 90% of his brain's capacity granting him enhanced physical powers and near-mastery control of his body (accelerated healing-factor and heightened senses) in an attempt to create metahuman super-soldiers for the U.S. military. Deathstroke became a mercenary soon after the experiment when he defied orders and rescued his friend Wintergreen, who had been sent on a suicide mission by a commanding officer with a grudge. However, Slade kept this career secret from his family, even though his wife was an expert military combat instructor.

A criminal named the Jackal took his younger son Joseph Wilson hostage to force Slade to divulge the name of a client who had hired him as an assassin. Slade refused, claiming it was against his personal honor code. He attacked and killed the kidnappers at the rendezvous. Unfortunately, Joseph's throat was slashed by one of the criminals before Slade could prevent it, destroying Joseph's vocal cords and rendering him mute.

After taking Joseph to the hospital, Adeline was enraged at his endangerment of her son and tried to kill Slade by shooting him, but only managed to destroy his right eye. Afterwards, his confidence in his physical abilities was such that he made no secret of his impaired vision, marked by his mask which has a black, featureless half covering his lost right eye. Without his mask, Slade wears an eye patch to cover his eye.

The Teen Titans
Slade has a long history as an enemy of the Teen Titans, beginning when his other son Grant received superhuman enhancements from the H.I.V.E., dubbed himself Ravager, and accepted a contract from them to kill or capture the Teen Titans. However, Grant's enhancements proved fatal, and Slade agreed to complete the contract. His first mission involved stealing the element Promethium from S.T.A.R. Labs and selling it as the ultimate weapon. He then kidnapped the Titans and placed them in the path of a Promethium bomb to test his device for the buyers, effectively killing two birds with one stone. The Titans escaped and pursued Deathstroke, but he severely wounded Beast Boy in his escape. This would be the start to a lasting animosity between the two.

Deathstroke next appeared in New York, holding officials hostage to lure the Titans into confronting him. Terra, a new ally of the Titans, and Beast Boy were the only ones available to answer the call. Terra knocked Beast Boy out and fought Deathstroke single-handedly in an effort to prove herself worthy of being a Titan. Deathstroke escaped as the other Titans arrived, but by then Terra had proven herself and the team offered her membership. Later that night, it was revealed that Terra and Deathstroke had conspired to fake the fight in a plot to infiltrate the team.

The Judas Contract
During The Judas Contract, the Titans eventually entrusted Terra with all of their secret identities. Once Slade had this information, he used it to systematically subdue each of the Titans, exploiting them at their weakest moments. Donna Troy was gassed at her photo studio, Changeling was anesthetized with tainted envelopes while responding to fan mail, Victor Stone was electrically shocked by a chair in his own apartment, Koriand'r was ambushed with a device that affected her powers, and Raven was taken down by Terra herself. Nightwing was last to be attacked and he was confronted by Deathstroke himself. He avoided being captured and soon discovered that his teammates had already been taken. Nightwing arrived at Titans Tower to discover Slade's ex-wife and son. She told Nightwing that Terra was a traitor, how each of his teammates were captured, and related the origin of Deathstroke.

Nightwing, to confront Deathstroke and the H.I.V.E., joined Jericho (Joseph Wilson). During the confrontation, Deathstroke recognized Jericho as his son, which caused him to hesitate. Jericho freed the Titans by possessing his father's body. After Terra died during the battle, Slade was then taken into custody.

Slade was put on trial for his crimes, but the trial was deliberately sabotaged by Changeling so that he could kill Slade himself, believing that he was responsible for Terra's betrayal of the Titans. Slade agreed to the confrontation, but showed up out of costume. Changeling found himself unable to kill Slade, so instead they talked. Feeling some empathy for his grief, Slade explained his past with Terra, and Changeling realized that Slade was not to blame for the choices that Terra had made. The two men parted on peaceful terms, with Slade returning to Africa with Wintergreen.

Titans Plague
Months later, Slade encountered the Titans again while they were investigating mysterious attacks and disappearances. Donna Troy is attacked by a group of strange beastmen and barely survives the encounter. Meanwhile, while attending a fundraiser with his father, Gar Logan recognizes Slade trying to maintain a low profile. When he finally catches up with Slade, he finds him about to kill the host of the fundraiser, Walter Lanier. He stops Deathstroke, but is surprised when Lanier turns into a bat-like creature and flies away. Slade reveals to the Titans that he was responsible for smuggling the drug the bestiamorphs were using to transform others, but did not realize what it was until it was too late. After Jericho and Raven were stricken by the plague, he aided them in destroying the beastmen and finding a cure for the contagion.

Titans Hunt
Shortly after this, he came to the Titans' assistance again during the Titans Hunt storyline. The members of the Titans, as well as many inactive members, all disappeared in a manner very similar to how they were abducted during the Judas Contract. Mento, an on-and-off member of the Doom Patrol, hires Deathstroke to find the missing Titans. He eventually discovers with Nightwing that the abductions were the work of the Wildebeest Society, and that their leader was none other than Titans member Jericho, Deathstroke's son.

It was revealed that Jericho had been possessed by the corrupted souls of Azarath, as they were using him to capture the Titans and use them as physical hosts to survive. During the transfer process, Jericho's true self resurfaced briefly, begging his father to kill him. To spare his son any more pain and save the remaining Titans, Slade was forced to drive a sword through Jericho's heart, seemingly killing him.

Afterward, Slade continued his life as a mercenary, but also acted as an occasional ally to the Titans, aiding them when mutual threats outweighed their rivalry, most notably during the Total Chaos storyline when the Team Titans arrived in the 20th Century to assassinate Donna Troy before she could give birth to her son, who in their timeline had grown up into the tyrannical despot Lord Chaos. Slade also met Pat Trayce, a tough former cop who would become the new Vigilante. Pat Trayce became Slade's lover later on, and the two developed a romantic as well as a professional relationship.

Family business
After Slade foiled an assassination attempt on the President of the United States, he was subsequently framed for the murder of a U.S. Senator. The man responsible had taken on the identity of the Ravager and was hunting down Slade's friends and loved ones. Eventually, with the help of the Titans and Sarge Steel, Slade was able to prove his innocence and the true culprit was revealed to be Steve Dayton, under the alias of the Crime Lord, who had again succumbed to mental instability caused by his Mento helmet.

Meanwhile, Slade's relationship with his estranged wife Adeline took a tragic turn, as Slade underwent a process to gain the ability of physical regeneration, allowing him to survive any wound so long as his brain is intact (but this power is limited, as Slade cannot regenerate his lost eye because that injury happened before he gained his healing factor). After gaining this power, Slade was forced to give his wife a blood transfusion to save her life, resulting in her gaining a similar healing factor which manifested itself as a form of immortality. This alteration of her DNA drove Adeline insane, shaming Deathstroke into going into a semi-retirement state.

In Titans #12, Deathstroke teamed up with the Titans to face his wife Adeline, who in her insane state had revived the H.I.V.E. and sought to rid the world of all superhumans, blaming them for Jericho's apparent death. During the battle, interrupted by Vandal Savage and a band of villains that he had organized from recent Titans battles, Adeline's throat was slit. In a brief return of sanity, she begged Slade to kill her, requesting him to reunite her with "my... our children..." because her version of the healing factor would not heal the wound, but only allow her to live in spite of it. Deathstroke refused, but Koriand'r shocked her teammates and Deathstroke by using her starbolt blast to disintegrate her completely, per Adeline's wishes. This was a turning point, as Deathstroke renounced all ties with the Titans as a result of Starfire's act.

It was then revealed that Jericho managed to transfer his consciousness into Deathstroke in the instant before his death. Taking control of his father, Jericho forced Deathstroke to murder his longtime butler, mentor and confidant Wintergreen. He then launched a series of attacks against the current Teen Titans, most notably shattering Impulse's knee with a shotgun blast, before leaving his father's body. Deathstroke has since manipulated his one remaining child Rose Wilson into the mercenary business as the new Ravager, to find and kill Jericho, using a specially designed serum to heighten her hostility and push her over the edge. Unfortunately, the process also resulted in her being driven at least partially insane, to the extent that she cut out her own left eye in an attempt to prove to her father that she was just like him.

Nightwing and Birds of Prey
Deathstroke appeared in Nightwing (vol. 2) #23 as a mercenary against Black Canary and Conner Hawke as part of the "Brotherhood of the Fist" tie-in to the No Man's Land story arc.

Deathstroke also appeared in Birds of Prey #22–24, where he was sent to Gorilla City by Blockbuster to get an ape-heart. He is accompanied by Lady Vic, Grimm, and Black Canary, who is posing as Oracle.

Identity Crisis
In the Identity Crisis miniseries, Deathstroke was enlisted as a bodyguard for Doctor Light, who was being pursued by the Justice League of America as a suspect in the murder of Sue Dibny. In the ensuing battle, Deathstroke nearly beat the team of Elongated Man, Flash, Zatanna, Hawkman, Green Arrow, Black Canary, Atom and Green Lantern. He systematically took out every member except for Rayner, whom he had the potential to disable through trying to usurp his ring's energies using his own formidable willpower. But before the outcome of this conflict with Green Lantern ended, Green Arrow stuck an arrow in Deathstroke's right eye socket, enraging him. Slade went ballistic, which derailed his pre-planned strategy and began to beat Green Arrow, but was stopped when the majority of the team tackled Deathstroke to the ground. Dr. Light used his powers to allow the two to escape. Near the end of Identity Crisis, Deathstroke confronts Green Arrow on a rooftop. Arrow sees his reflection in the windows of a nearby building, but when he turns to confront Slade, Deathstroke is gone. Instead, Green Arrow finds Slade's cowl and a note stuck to the wall by the very arrow he stabbed in Slade's eye socket. The note reads "This is yours – we're not done."

Infinite Crisis
Deathstroke was a founding member of Lex Luthor's Secret Society of Super Villains in the Infinite Crisis storyline. He was seen in Infinite Crisis #1, hiding in a warehouse south of Metropolis waiting to ambush the Freedom Fighters with several other members. The battle did not last long, and by the end, Deathstroke had killed the Phantom Lady. Slade is also the one who landed the final stroke on Uncle Sam by shooting him in the back (and leading to his apparent death).

He was the employer of Nightwing, whom he hired to train his daughter Rose. However, after the two have a confrontation with Superman, Deathstroke discovers that Nightwing had been teaching Rose the values of heroism. He could not kill Grayson in front of his daughter, because doing so would undo all of Slade's teachings. Nightwing offered a deal: he would stay away from Rose if Slade would keep the metahuman villains out of Blüdhaven. The deal held for 34 hours until Infinite Crisis #4, when Slade, under the orders of Alexander Luthor Jr., the real leader of the Society, went with several villains (including old Titans and Doom Patrol foes and Brotherhood of Evil members Monsieur Mallah and Brain) to drop Chemo, another fellow villain who appeared to be a nearly brainless monster made of pure energy and radioactive chemicals, on Blüdhaven, killing over 100,000 people. Slade gave the explanation to the Brotherhood that Nightwing should be made to believe that he can never go home again.

Nightwing took the first of his revenge by bursting in on Deathstroke and Rose's training session, revealing to the latter that the kryptonite that Deathstroke had implanted in place of her missing eye was radioactive and deadly to humans as well as to Kryptonians (as revealed by Luthor's old possession of a kryptonite ring that had forced him to transfer his brain to a cloned body). Angered, Slade went after Nightwing with a grenade, only to have Rose try to stop him. Amid the smoke of the resulting explosion, Rose fled, telling her father that she hated him. Nightwing disappeared as well, but not before leaving a note for Slade warning him that he would be back to make him pay for Blüdhaven.

At the climactic Battle of Metropolis at the conclusion of Infinite Crisis, Slade was confronted by Batman, Robin and Nightwing. During the struggle, he was questioned regarding his motives for aiding the Secret Society. His claims of monetary motivation were deemed unsatisfactory; Batman accused him of having forsaken his code of honor, and Nightwing said it was because his family had abandoned him. Enraged, Slade said that was because of Nightwing, and that it was always because of him, before Batman told him to take responsibility for his actions and he was rendered unconscious.

One Year Later

Slade appears in the Green Arrow series after the one year jump in DC Comics' storylines. Apparently in hiding, he nearly murders a crony of several Star City businessmen who want to hire him for a murder. Before finishing his violent refusal, he asks the name of the target. When informed that it was to be the mayor of Star City, Oliver Queen (whom Deathstroke knows is secretly Green Arrow), he spares the lackey and decides to take the job.

However, things do not quite go according to plan, with Green Arrow using the resources of both his identities, trapping him within a ring of armed National Guardsmen. The fight ends with Deathstroke's arrest and subsequent conviction and incarceration; however, this is revealed as a ploy to gain access to Constantine Drakon, another jailed foe of Green Arrow who has information on the hero's activities in the lost year, which include Green Arrow studying under Natas, an assassin who once trained Deathstroke himself.

Deathstroke is also active behind the scenes in Teen Titans, currently in the process of organizing a counter-team of teen superhumans that will be known as Titans East. The current Titans team included Ravager, who now wanted nothing to do with her father. Deathstroke seemingly intended to "reclaim" Ravager and a recently resurrected Jericho from the Titans or, if that failed, to crush them along with the rest of the team. For these reasons, he specially selected each member of Titans East, believing that, overall, each member would successfully counteract every member of the current Teen Titans line-up.

As indicated over the course of the subsequent issues, Deathstroke was manipulating every member of his new team in one way or another. He had blackmailed former Titan Risk while at the same time offering him an outlet for his rage, was drugging Batgirl with the same serum he had used on Rose, and supplied Inertia with a formula that granted superhuman speed to compensate for the loss of the Speed Force following the initial battle with Superboy-Prime. His team, however, slowly fell apart over the course of the attack, as Robin managed to free Batgirl of his mind control serum and Raven convinced Duela Dent to switch sides. Slade and his remaining Titans subsequently faced off against both the current Titans and a group of old Titans led by Nightwing. Although he was defeated, he still managed to escape with the aid of Inertia. In the end, however, it was revealed to the readers that Slade's real mission was to provide his children with something he could never offer them: a real family, in the form of the Teen Titans. By attacking the Titans, he insured that Rose and Jericho would become more trusted by their associates, and thus grow closer to the team.

Recently, Deathstroke took credit for somehow twisting (through unknown means) the powers of Geo-Force, the half-brother of the original Terra, into the same powers as his traitorous sister. Using this leverage, Deathstroke offered to reverse the process only if Geo-Force became his own personal spy within the Justice League. Unfortunately for Deathstroke, Geo-Force alerted Batman, Superman and Wonder Woman of Deathstroke's scheme, which culminated in Geo-Force alerting the League that Deathstroke (whose rivalry with Green Arrow had reached vendetta-level proportions) planned on using an army of supervillains to crash Green Arrow and Black Canary's wedding. Weeks later, Geo-Force was tortured by Gorilla Grodd after the League was kidnapped by the Injustice League, and ultimately transferred to Batman's newest incarnation of the Outsiders afterward, robbing Deathstroke of his potential pawn.

Deathstroke can be seen as a member of Libra's Secret Society of Super Villains.

Deathstroke is gravely injured with his own sword by Geo-Force in DC Universe: Last Will and Testament. Following his injury, he is recuperating at Belle Reve while doctors labor to save him. Deathstroke dreams of his family members and all of the people that he has let down. When he awakens, he vows that he will never again be haunted by the past.

Ravager comes to visit him, but in fact, wants to finish her father off. She tries to strangle him with a plastic wire, but Deathstroke is recuperated enough that he can fend off her attack. He escapes from the facility and steals a helicopter. Later, Deathstroke finds a young street urchin that he decides to take under his wing.

Blackest Night
In the Teen Titans (vol. 3) tie-in to the Blackest Night crossover event, Deathstroke is living in the deceased Wintergreen's house and reading his journal, when he is attacked by Rose again. During the fight, the two are attacked by their deceased relatives Grant, Wade, and Adeline, who, along with Wintergreen, have all been reanimated as Black Lanterns. Deathstroke and Rose are forced to work together and fight for their lives against the Black Lanterns.

The two hopelessly fight the regenerating Black Lanterns until Jericho, cured from his earlier insanity, arrives and turns the tide of the fight. During the course of the battle, Deathstroke confesses to his children that part of the reason why he menaced the Teen Titans for so many years was that he felt that by forcing his children to hate him, they would have a chance of escaping the sorrow and pain that a life with him would entail. Just as Slade is overwhelmed and about to be killed, Jericho somehow uses his abilities to sever the connection between the Black Lanterns and their power rings, permanently sending them back to the grave. After realizing that her mother was not reborn as a member of the Black Lantern Corps, Rose comes to the conclusion that she must somehow still be alive, and leaves after threatening to kill Slade if he tries to stop her. Jericho chooses to stay with his father, reasoning that only Slade would have the courage to kill him if he were to ever return to madness.

Batman and Robin
Recently, Deathstroke has been seen working with Talia al Ghul, controlling the body and physical actions of the current Robin to kill the recent Batman. Deathstroke is able to control Robin's actions, thanks to a neural-implant inserted into Robin's spine by his mother while it was being surgically replaced. Batman defeats Deathstroke by taking advantage of the two-way connection between him and Robin by using a taser on Robin, the resulting electric shock overwhelming Deathstroke's enhanced senses. He then tracks Slade down and attacks him in his hospital bed for controlling Robin and for the Chemo attack, informing Slade that what happened then is just a 'trailer' for what he will do later.

Titans: Villains for Hire
Following the encounter with the Black Lanterns, Deathstroke recruits a team of supervillains consisting of Tattooed Man, Cheshire, Osiris, and the new character Cinder following the launch of Brightest Day. The team ambushes Ryan Choi in his home, and then battles him. This ends with Deathstroke driving his sword through Ryan's chest, killing him. He then gives the deceased hero's body to Dwarfstar.

Following the assassination of the Atom, Deathstroke and the Titans are hired to kill Lex Luthor during his stay in Midway City. The attack is revealed to be a ruse crafted by Slade and Luthor to draw out a traitor on Luthor's security staff, who is revealed to be a shape-shifting assassin named Facade. After the Titans capture Facade and turn him over to the scientists at LexCorp, Luthor rewards Slade by examining technology that he had earlier ordered Tattooed Man and Cheshire to steal. Slade claims that this will bring him one step closer to his true goal: the ability to somehow cheat death itself. He also succeeds in recruiting Arsenal, a former member of the Teen Titans and Justice League, into the team. Shortly after inducting Arsenal into the team, Slade accepts a mission to rescue a child from a drug lord named Elijah. After discovering that Elijah is using the bodies of kidnapped children to create an addictive drug called Bliss, the Titans promptly kill the gangster and shut down his operation. As the Titans are preparing to return to the Labyrinth, Cheshire notices that Slade has tied up DJ Molecule, a powerful metahuman who was working for Elijah as a bodyguard. When asked what he is doing with the young man, Slade cryptically responds by saying that he only accepted the mission to capture Molecule for some unknown purpose.

Afterward, Slade and his team arrive at South Pacific Island to kill cult leader Drago over the arena production of blind warriors; however, his team, Arsenal, and Cheshire betray him, revealing that they had been working with Drago. While Slade is held captive, Drago arrives and reveals to him that he is actually Slade's old friend, Corporal Daniel Rogers, who abandoned him during the civil war in Afghanistan. Drago then gouges out Slade's left eye making him blind. Slade is then imprisoned along with Arsenal and begins to tell him about his past with Drago. Later, Drago takes a trip down memory lane with Slade, explaining how he lost his sight, and basically re-telling his origin and how it involved Jeremiah, right before he throws Slade beneath the complex to fend for his life against a crazed subhuman. During the fights, Slade's left eye was restored due to his metahuman healing factor, and the Titans arrive to rescue him. Slade and the Titans break into Drago's mansion and attack. Slade drugs Drago so that he cannot focus his telepathic powers. When Drago is defeated, Slade allows him to live and the Titans then leave his island. While returning to the labyrinth, Slade and the Titans are approached by the Atom and the Justice League, who attempt to arrest them for the murder of Ryan Choi.

During the battle of Slade's Titans against the Justice League in Khandaq, the battle was stopped by Isis, who forces them to choose between leaving or continuing the fight and starting World War III. The Justice League chose to retreat and Slade retrieves a sample of Supergirl's Kryptonian blood. Upon returning to the labyrinth, with his workers, Doctor Sivana and Doctor Impossible, Slade reveals to the Titans that their efforts support creation of a diabolical invention called the "Methuselah Device" for his dying son Jericho.

The machine successfully heals Jericho, and Slade offers its abilities to all the Titans, offering to restore their deceased loved ones as payment for their services. All agree but Cinder, who does not want her brothers to live forever, as she claims to be doing. She attacks Cheshire and Osiris, and is then joined by Tattooed Man and Arsenal. As the Titans come to blows, Deathstroke attempts to take Jericho and leave, but Jericho, disgusted at what his father did to achieve his restoration, takes over his body, intending to destroy first the Methuselah Device, then himself and Deathstroke. While the Titans fight over the Methuselah Device, its power source, a metahuman named DJ Molecule, is released. DJ Molecule blasts Slade, knocking Jericho out of his body. Arsenal then attacks him for stealing the Titans' legacy. Slade escapes and the Methuselah Device is destroyed by Cinder. Afterwards, Slade berates himself and becomes Deathstroke once more.

The New 52
In The New 52 (a 2011 reboot of the DC Comics universe), Deathstroke is known as a top mercenary around the world. Deathstroke is hired by a man named Cristoph for a mission that forces him to work with a team of younger mercenaries known as the Alpha Dogs. Their target is Jeffrey Bode, an arms dealer traveling on a plane. After discovering that the weapons Bode is trafficking are clones of the villain Clayface, Deathstroke and the other mercenaries are able to dispatch them, killing Bode in the process and retrieving a suitcase he had in his possession. Deathstroke subsequently betrays and kills the Alpha Dogs, enraged by the notion that his employers feel that he is unable to accomplish his tasks alone. Deathstroke then begins to take on increasingly dangerous missions in an effort to prove his worth, but is also spurred on by the contents of the suitcase he retrieved from Bode – namely the mask and knife belonging to his son Grant, both of which were stained with fresh blood, indicating that he may be still alive. During this time, Deathstroke is pursued by a new villain known as Legacy. Deathstroke kills Legacy, but another Legacy, donning the same colors as the last one, appears again and again. It turns out the parents of one of the Alpha Dog members have hired multiple mercenaries to kill Deathstroke, all donning the green and purple color, to get revenge on him. Deathstroke tracks them down, but is confronted by his son Grant. It is revealed that all of this has been a plot to lure Deathstroke to him. Although Deathstroke manages to kill both the parents, Grant defeats him, claiming superiority over Deathstroke. Grant is about to finish Slade, but he hesitates, and leaves. Recovering from his injuries, Grant takes another contract, Slade is happy that his son has become a better warrior than him, and then visits his father's hospital bed to mention that he has grown up to be a greater man than him.

Slade takes a contract from Harvest, to bring the Ravagers back to the colony. He does this in exchange for his daughter Rose and Terra. It turns out that Lynch, the leader of Team 7 had needed Terra to stop a rampaging Majestic, who was thought to be killed by Dinah Drake's sonic scream. For a plan B, to Slade's dismay, he calls in Joseph Wilson, now going by the name Jericho, with Adeline and Grant, to stop Majestic. Instead of stopping Majestic, Jericho takes control of Majestic, Adeline, Grant, and Terra to kill his father. Adeline dies, buried in the rubble caused by Majestic's stampede. Jericho momentarily loses control by this time, and Slade, Rose, and Terra manage to restrain Majestic, with the help of Rose's Gen-factor. However, Jericho retains control over Grant and Terra. When Slade knocks Terra unconscious, a cornered Jericho threatens to stab himself and Grant with a sword. Deathstroke, without hesitation, drives the sword into both of them, killing them instantly. But a later scene suggests Jericho has escaped, since there is shown a worker with glowing green eyes walking out of the clean-up scene, strongly implying Jericho has possessed the man to flee.

Origins
Deathstroke's altered origin is introduced in Deathstroke (vol. 2) #0. The fact that he participated in the military at 16 and met Adeline has not changed. Already a legend in the army, Slade was drafted into Team 7 and went on many missions. In one mission, Slade was gravely injured and had to undergo an operation that enhanced his abilities, making him virtually a superhuman. After this, he married Adeline and had two sons, Grant and Joseph. Around this time, Slade received intel that his best friend, Wintergreen, was caught in Somalia. He donned a mask and flew to Somalia to rescue Wintergreen, slaughtering all the captors. Deathstroke the Terminator was born. As his fame grew, his enemies did too. An attack targeting his house seemingly killed Joseph and Adeline. With evidence that the attack was from North Korea, Slade killed a group of North Korean soldiers, but lost his right eye in the process. It is later shown that Joseph and Adeline are still alive.

This origin was again changed in Teen Titans: Deathstroke #1. After a mission that involved destroying a children's hospital which Slade was unaware of, he quit the army. After Team 7's termination, Slade started to operate under the Deathstroke identity. He took Grant on his mission, considering him as not only his son, but as a business partner, and the only person he could trust. But during a mission in North Korea, their refuge was infiltrated and North Korean soldiers barged in, firing into the house. Grant was shot, and as Slade looked back at his son, a bullet penetrated his right eye, blinding it. Enraged, Slade went on a massacre and slew the soldiers. However, Grant was presumed dead. Now, Slade works for the sake of his daughter Rose, as he knows the only thing that will keep Rose safe after he is gone is money. It is unclear if Rose's mother is Adeline or not.

Team 7
Five years before taking the contract from Harvest, before taking the name Deathstroke, Slade once operated with Team 7. With metahuman threats rising, The Majestic Project, a plan to control future metahuman threats, was devised by John Lynch. And to secure the project, Team 7 was created and Slade was recruited. The first mission was retrieving the Eclipso Gem, where Slade was possessed by Eclipso and Alex Fairchild had to drive a sword through his chest to save him. Their next mission site is the Advanced Prosthetic Research Center. Dr. Henshaw is tasked into reactivating the android Spartan. But the Spartan Subject is activated, infecting everyone in the center to be turned into mindless cyborgs, including Caitlin Fairchild. Team 7 is sent to the spot. Pilot Summer Ramos is killed by a cyborg. The team breaks into the facility, intending to bottleneck them. Caitlin appears out from a door. Relieved to see his daughter, Alex Fairchild rushes to her and hugs her, but actually infected, Caitlin stabs her father to death. In a fit of rage, Slade chases after her and dispatches her. Then from behind, Henshaw, temporarily free of the Spartan virus, explained that this was a distraction by the Spartan Subject to target agent James Bronson, currently at his home. A Spartan cyborg breaks into his apartment, and attacks, activating Majestic. Majestic actually turns out to be agent Bronson's Gen-factor, which was activated when the Kaizen, the dictator of the island nation of Gamorra, sent the cyborg to trigger the Majestic Persona. It is later explained by Lynch that another purpose of Team 7 was to activate potential metagenes in the agents to create powerful human weapons, which would make America invincible to other nations. Agents like Slade, Dinah Drake, and Cole Cash had gained their metahuman abilities by Lynch. Bronson was planned to be Majestic, but the activation of the gene just then had been unexpected.

Team 7's last mission was to salvage Pandora's Box. The Team, with new pilot Steve Trevor is sent to Gamorra. The Kaizen, who possessed Pandora's Box, prepared to unleash its power. When they reach the Kaizen's palace, the child precogs show the Team a future where Kaizen Gamorra has opened the Box and the whole world is going off the rails. Hearing the precogs say the Kaizen had to be stopped to prevent this fate, Majestic flies up into space, and impacts the coast of Gamorra with the force of a comet, creating a massive tidal wave, annihilating five million residents. But the Kaizen's palace stood however, and the team couldn't defeat him, until Majestic burst in. The Kaizen explains that Majestic is the key to opening the box, which also explains why he targeted Bronson in the first place. Majestic kills the Kaizen with a single blow. But he subdues to the Box's power, and starts attacking the team. Dinah lets out a canary cry that destroys the entire palace. In the chaos, Lynch is possessed by the box, but Amanda Waller knocks the box from his hands and tells Dinah to take the box away as far as possible. Lynch tries to take down the helicopter containing Dinah and the remaining team agents, but Waller shoots him from behind, seemingly killing Lynch and leading to Team 7's dissolution.

Forever Evil
During the Forever Evil storyline, Steve Trevor encounters Deathstroke, Copperhead, and Shadow Thief at the White House when he is looking for the President. Later, the party turns up in Wayne Industries with Power Ring to fight Batman, Lex Luthor, and other heroes and villains who are against the Crime Syndicate. Deathstroke has Lex Luthor's life in his hands, but Lex Luthor persuades him that it will do him no good if the Syndicate takes over the Earth. Slade has a change of mind and shoots Copperhead in the head, killing him. After they defeat the rest of the gang, Deathstroke remarks that Lex Luthor ought to pay him a big fat check after this is over. Deathstroke then joins Batman and Luthor in the battle against the syndicate he is seen battling Deathstorm when the Syndicate attacks the fallen watchtower. The syndicate later retreats when they find out that Alexander Luthor has been freed. Deathstroke witnesses the only "hero" from Earth-Three kill Deathstorm and steal his abilities. Alexander Luthor then attacks Deathstroke, shattering his helmet while he lets out a string of obscenities directed at Luthor.

DC Rebirth

In DC Rebirth, Deathstroke, along with Lady Shiva, is mentioned as one of the enemies that Batman thinks may be attacking him on Two-Face's orders. He also stars in an ongoing series about his exploits as a mercenary and his tumultuous relationship with his ex-wife and children as well introducing Hosun Park, Slade's son-in-law and hacker. During one such operation, he comes into contract with the Red Lion/Matthew Bland, the President/Dictator of the African nation of Buredunia. Bland offers him a high sum for making sure his competition does not bring in US forces, and later takes one of Slade's Promethium suits for himself. Later, Slade attempts to save his son Grant from dying in battle with the Teen Titans by using Speed Force energy drained from Kid Flash to time travel. He becomes trapped in the Speed Force in the process, but is rescued the Titans and Teen Titans. The experience moves him to give up being Deathstroke, so he builds a team of heroes called Defiance, with both his children, Wintergreen, Adeline Kane, and Wallace as his teammates.
It was later disbanded after Power Girl took her own life, and Slade's attempts have grown worse to himself.

Deathstroke was later imprisoned in Arkham Asylum, though he escapes and is later captured by the new Damian Wayne's new roster of Teen Titans. In a bid to fulfill his death-wish, he releases all the inmates that Robin had been locking up illegally to attack the group. He tried to goad Damian into killing him, but he was instead killed by Red Arrow.

Characterization

Christopher Priest's characterization 
Priest characterized Slade Wilson during his DC Rebirth series as professional assassin who kills people for money, uses his resources to hire proficient lawyers able to prevent general law enforcement and covert entities from completely proving that Slade Wilson and Deathstroke are one of the same. Priest describes him as emotionally crippled, desperately loving his children and desires closeness with them but is considered too emotional damaged to truly commit and as such, is a poor father and often suffers from past choices made between his children and wife, Adeline. Priest also admits to his version being more laconic than others, trusting little, speaking only when necessary, and believing everyone else to be "idiots".  As an assassin, Deathstroke has completed most of his contracts and is notorious in doing so, only having failed his contract with H.I.V.E against the Teen Titans. His fee is also considered to be seven figures (with a 6 figures deposit).

Powers and abilities 
An exceptional soldier with Special Forces training prior to receiving his super-powers, Slade Wilson was selected due to his impressive skills as a decorated soldier for the United States Army. After undergoing an experimental procedure to create a super soldier, Wilson's physical and mental abilities were enhanced, granting him levels of near superhuman strength, speed, endurance, intelligence, senses, etc. Christopher Priest would compare his physical abilities to be roughly similar to Marvel's Captain America. Deathstroke also possess a healing factor, able to regenerate at a rapid accelerated rate depending on the complexity of tissue damage although he cannot regenerate new organs or his damaged eye. His regeneration abilities also slow down his aging process and is resistant to toxins. He also possesses an eidetic memory. Deathstroke was also originally stated to be able to use 90% of his brain, giving him heightened mental capabilities. However, this ability was later removed, having been stated that such a power would have made Deathstroke a telepath. This ability was later retconned to explain that Deathstroke's brain processes information nine times more efficiently than a human's. 

In addition to his enhancements, he is considered as master tactician and strategist rivaling Batman, specializing in using psychological warfare tactics against his enemies. Deathstroke is also a superb martial artist, having mastered multiple martial arts disciplines. In some stories he is considered to surpass Batman in combat and has bested him multiple times. With his elite military training, advanced martial skills, and tactical mind, Deathstroke is a dangerous combatant often considered the most feared and deadly assassin in the world (alongside peers such as Lady Shiva and Bronze Tiger).

Other versions

Just Imagine...
In Stan Lee's Just Imagine..., a version of Deathstroke exists as a one-eyed criminal on death row named Deke Durgan. He was saved by Reverend Darrk and given powers alongside Parasite and Blockbuster as the Doom Patrol to battle the JLA. This Deathstroke was given a purple aura as part of his mutation and a fatal touch.

Earth One
In Teen Titans: Earth One continuity, an unscarred Slade is a member of S.T.A.R. Labs, which in this version are the main antagonistic force behind the creation of the Titans. His son Joseph and him as lead enforcers who engage the Titans.

Deathstroke: Journey's End
The Deathstroke Annual for 1994 was an Elseworlds story featuring Deathstroke in a post-apocalyptic world. Deathstroke fights a legion of mutants and desperately tries to help humanity rise from the ashes of its ruined civilization.

The Uncanny X-Men/The New Teen Titans
In the intercompany crossover The Uncanny X-Men and The New Teen Titans, Deathstroke meets his equal in the form of Wolverine; the two fight to a near standstill. At the same time, however, he proved skilled enough to defeat Colossus in a one-on-one fight despite the latter's superior physical strength.

Amalgam Comics
In Amalgam Comics, Deathstroke is combined with Marvel's Daredevil to become "Dare the Terminator", alias Slade Murdock. Unlike Wilson and Murdock, Dare is a woman. Though Dare is legally blind, she wears an eyepatch because of her mangled right eye. She also has horns surgically attached to her forehead. She uses a sword in combat.

In another comic, there is a Deathstroke amalgam called "X-Stroke the Eliminator", who is a merging of Deathstroke and X-Cutioner. It is mentioned he is responsible for convincing Terra-X (amalgam of Tara Markov and Terrax and Dare's daughter) to betray the X-Patrol (an amalgam of X-Force and Doom Patrol).

Tangent Comics
In Tangent Comics, Deathstroke is an armored supervillain and a member of the Fatal Five. This version exists on Earth-97 of the Old Multiverse and Earth-9 of the New Multiverse.

Mash-Up
In the Superman/Batman storyline "Mash-Up", elements of Slade are combined with parts of Doomsday, creating the villain "Doomstroke".

Flashpoint
In the Flashpoint reality, Deathstroke is a pirate, searching with his crew formed by Sonar, whom he broke out of a floating prison, Icicle, Fisherman, Clayface, Machiste and The Eel for any sunken loot to steal in the flooded remains of Paris, and also for his daughter Rose, who has been kidnapped by persons unknown. Deathstroke and his crew were however soon attacked by Aquaman and his brother the Ocean Master. Aquaman stabs Deathstroke in the chest with his trident telling Ocean Master "no survivors". After the attack, Deathstroke was saved from death by Sonar, who demanded to be made second-in-command in return. While continuing their journey, the pirates were ambushed by the fleet of Warlord and forced to surrender, but are then saved by Jenny Blitz who destroyed one of Warlord's ships. Afterwards, Blitz agrees to join Deathstroke in searching for his daughter and developed a relationship in-between. Soon Deathstroke and Blitz were alerted that his crew were planning a mutiny. Deathstroke and Blitz fought and killed the treacherous crew, but Sonar manage to contact another pirate fleet under the leadership of the Caretaker before Deathstroke shot him. Later, Deathstroke and Jenny approaches the Caretaker's fleet and discovers Rose is being held captive. Deathstroke formulates a plan by offering to exchange Caretaker with a stasis-like Jenny for Rose's freedom. However, the Caretaker double-crosses on their deal and have his crew to attack him. But Deathstroke unleashes Jenny from her stasis upon Caretaker's fleet. During the battle, Deathstroke ignited a grenade at a weapon stockpile which destroyed Caretaker's ship and its crew with it. Deathstroke and Blitz were rescued by Rose. Reunited with his daughter, Deathstroke sails towards an unknown destination.

Superman: American Alien
Deathstroke appears in Superman: American Alien, where he was sent by Carmine Falcone to assassinate a young Bruce Wayne who is supposedly on a yacht party. However, like everyone else on the boat, he mistakes a young Clark Kent for Bruce and is surprised when the neurotoxin he put in Clark's drink just makes him dizzy instead of killing him. He tries cutting him up with his sword, but is further befuddled when the sword breaks over Clark's durable skin, and Clark simply flicks him off of the yacht to defeat him.

Injustice: Gods Among Us
Deathstroke appears in Injustice: Gods Among Us' chapter 35 of Year Five, the last series before the game. The actions of the Regime have forced Deathstroke into early retirement, causing him to develop a grudge. Batman and Lex Luthor need a Mother Box located in S.T.A.R. Labs that will allow them to pull over doppelgangers from another universe to combat the Regime. Since Batman is the most wanted man on the planet, Deathstroke is the next best person to retrieve it, which he agrees to do. He breaks into the facility and easily takes out any soldier standing guard. Upon obtaining the Mother Box, he is attacked by Metamorpho, whom he kills. Afterwards, realizing he will not be able to get out with the Mother Box, Deathstroke uploads a blueprint of the device and sends it to Batman and Luthor so they can build it themselves. He is then captured and subsequently tortured by Cyborg and Raven. In Ground Zero, which adapts the events of the game, Deathstroke is saved and aids the Insurgency in taking over the Watchtower. When Luthor calls to inform him that he will be using the kryptonite gun on Superman, Deathstroke urges him to use it to kill him so they can finally be free of his rule.

Batman: The Adventures Continue
A DCAU version of Slade Wilson was introduced in the 2nd issue of Batman: The Adventures Continue. A mercenary wanted by Interpol (described by Commissioner Gordon as "one of the deadliest men to ever carry a weapon"), he is hired by Lex Luthor to kill Batman. To hide his true goals from his quarry, he tried to get close to Batgirl and Robin, trying to recruit them to his side. This version is aided by a partner called Sunny, who helped drug Clayface and masquerade as Firefly.

The Other History of the DC Universe V 1 3
In The Other History of the DC Universe V 1 3, while this issue of this series narrated from the point of view of non-white characters wants to point out the problematic relationship between Deathstroke and Terra from The Judas Contract, it does, however, spread further dangerous disinformation on the topic of pedophilia, how it works, and the difference between pedophilia (primary sexual attraction to prepubescents) and ephebophilia (primary sexual attraction to 15 to 19 y.o. adolescents and young adults). In fact, Deathstroke is explicitly described as a "pedophilic rapist" here. While Terra was 15 when she and Deathstroke started their relationship and the average age of consent in America is 16 (at least in real life, it is not clear how laws works in DC Universe/s and superheroistic comics' universes in general), the relationship between Terra and Deathstroke cannot be considered pedophilic due to the age of Terra being over her age of puberty, and also due to the fact that Deathstroke was not really in love with her and was simply using and manipulating her to spy on and weaken the Teen Titans.

Collected editions
Part of the eponymous series has been collected into a trade paperback:
 Deathstroke, The Terminator: Full Cycle (collects Deathstroke, the Terminator #1–5 and New Titans #70)
 Deathstroke, The Terminator Vol. 1: Assassins (Deathstroke, the Terminator #1–9, New Titans #70 )
 Deathstroke, The Terminator Vol. 2: Sympathy For The Devil (Deathstroke, the Terminator #10–13, Annual #1, Superman Vol. 2 #68 )
 Deathstroke, The Terminator Vol. 3: Nuclear Winter (Deathstroke, the Terminator #14–20, Showcase '93 #6–11 )
 Deathstroke, The Terminator Vol. 4: Crash or Burn (Deathstroke, the Terminator #21–25, Annual #2 )
 Deathstroke, The Terminator Vol. 5: World Tour
(Deathstroke, the Terminator #26-34 )

The New 52
 Deathstroke Vol. 1: Legacy (collects Deathstroke Vol. 2 #1–8)
 Deathstroke Vol. 2: Lobo Hunt (Deathstroke Vol. 2 #0, #9–20)
 Deathstroke Vol. 1: Gods of War (Deathstroke Vol. 3 #1–6 )
 Deathstroke Vol. 2: God Killer (Deathstroke Vol. 3 #7–10, Annual #1, Sneak Preview from Convergence: Batman: Shadow of the Bat #2 )
 Deathstroke Vol. 3: Suicide Run (Deathstroke Vol. 3 #11–16 )
 Deathstroke Vol. 4: Family Business (Deathstroke Vol. 3 #17–20, Annual #2 )

DC Rebirth
 Deathstroke Vol. 1: The Professional (Deathstroke: Rebirth #1, Deathstroke Vol. 4 #1–5)
 Deathstroke Vol. 2: The Gospel of Slade (Deathstroke Vol. 4 #6–11)
 Deathstroke Vol. 3: Twilight (Deathstroke Vol. 4 #12–18)
 Deathstroke vol. 4: Defiance (Deathstroke Vol. 4 #21–25)
 Deathstroke Vol. 5: The Fall of Slade (Deathstroke Vol. 4 #26–29 and Annual #1)
 Batman vs. Deathstroke  (Deathstroke Vol. 4 #30–35)
 Deathstroke' vol. 6: Arkham (Deathstroke Vol. 4 #36-40)
 Teen Titans/Deathstroke: The Terminus Agenda  (Deathstroke Vol. 4 #41–43, Teen Titans Vol. 6 #28-30)
 Deathstroke: R.I.P.  (Deathstroke Vol. 4 #44–50)

Infinite Frontier 

 Deathstroke Inc. Vol. 1: King of the Supervillains (Deathstroke Inc. #1-7 and a story from Batman: Urban Legends #6)
 Batman: Shadow War (Shadow War: Alpha #1, Batman #122-123, Deathstroke Inc. #8-9, Robin #13-14, Shadow War Zone #1, and Shadow War: Omega #1)

In other media

Television

Animation
 The character appears as the Teen Titans' archenemy in Teen Titans, voiced by Ron Perlman. This version is simply referred to as "Slade" and is depicted as an enigmatic criminal mastermind, dispatching other supervillains and robotic henchmen to eliminate the Teen Titans. In the first season, he manipulates and blackmails Robin into being his apprentice, though the Titans ultimately free Robin from Slade's control. In the second season, Slade searches for a new protégé in Terra, making her a double-agent and his new apprentice. They succeed in defeating the Titans and take over the city, only for Terra to sacrifice herself to kill Slade and save the Titans. In the fourth season, Trigon resurrects Slade as an undead pyrokinetic being to aid in his conquest of Earth. After Trigon betrays him, Slade temporarily joins forces with the Teen Titans to defeat Trigon, being fully revived in the process before getting away. In the series finale, Slade taunts and torments Beast Boy to let go of Terra, who has been unexplainably resurrected.
 Deathstroke appears in Young Justice, voiced by Wentworth Miller in "The Fix" and by Fred Tatasciore for all subsequent appearances. He first appears in the season two episode "True Colors", during which he takes Sportsmaster's place as The Light's enforcer, and serves as Black Manta's personal assassin for the remainder of season two. Deathstroke returns in season three, having replaced Ra's al Ghul as a member of The Light and the leader of the League of Shadows. He and Lady Shiva forge an alliance with Bane to form a metahuman trafficking ring on the island of Santa Prisca. After Nightwing's Outsiders team seemingly frees the metahuman Princess Terra Markov from The Light's captivity, Terra is revealed to be a double-agent working for Deathstroke. However, Terra is ultimately persuaded by her new friends to turn on Deathstroke and The Light.
 Deathstroke appears in Beware the Batman, voiced by Robin Atkin Downes. This version was originally a CIA agent who was terminated by his mentor Alfred Pennyworth for his ruthless methods. Slade Wilson then is known as the international assassin "Deathstroke", and is eventually hired by Anarky and Harvey Dent to kill Batman. Deathstroke accepts the contract to exact revenge on Pennyworth who has since "replaced" him with Bruce Wayne as a protégé. Slade poses as "Dane Lisslow" to get close to Bruce and Alfred, and ends up losing his right eye during a fight with Batman in the series finale.
 The character (once again referred to as "Slade") is alluded to several times in Teen Titans Go!. His face can be seen on Robin's punching bag in numerous episodes, and he is indirectly mentioned by Rose Wilson / Ravager in "Cool School" when his daughter tells Raven that they both have father issues. In "Terra-ized", Terra infiltrates the Titans Tower to steal the team's secrets for a mysterious criminal mastermind (implied to be Slade). Despite his name being in the title of "The Return of Slade", the character is not featured in the episode; the Titans instead battle him off-screen, later commenting on how amazing it was. Slade's only physical appearance in the series is at the end of "The Titans Show", where Control Freak summons him and many other villains to fight the Titans.
 Deathstroke appears in the The CW series Deathstroke: Knights & Dragons, voiced by Michael Chiklis.
 Deathstroke appears in the DC Super Hero Girls episode "#DinnerForFive", voiced by D. C. Douglas. While still a mercenary, this version is also a caring father towards Rose (who is aware of his profession) and is trying to reconnect with Rose after being absent for most of his daughter's life. While targeting Commissioner Gordon, Deathstroke battles Batgirl, and later recognizes her alter-ego when Rose invites her for dinner. Once again fighting Batgirl, Deathstroke almost kills her, but is stopped from doing so by Rose. Apologizing for betraying his daughter's trust, he promises not to bother the Gordons anymore and decides to take some time off to work on rebuilding his relationship with Rose.

Live-action 
 The Deathstroke codename is seen in the Lois & Clark: The New Adventures of Superman episode "Bob and Carol and Lois and Clark", where it's used by original character Earl Gregg (played by Antonio Sabàto Jr. and also known by the alias "Bob Stanford"), an assassin with unstable magnetic powers and who wears a containment suit.
 Slade Wilson appears in the tenth season of Smallville, portrayed by Michael Hogan in the episodes "Patriot" and "Icarus". This version is a United States Army Lieutenant General and a suspected war criminal behind the anti-superhero Vigilante Registration Act legislation. Slade is later saved from death by Darkseid with advanced military technology, losing his right eye but gaining healing abilities in the process (rendering him "beyond Death's stroke"). After failing to kill Mera and Aquaman, Slade returned to his regular activities and found himself in combat against Hawkman. Wilson managed to get the upper hand and stabbed Hawkman in the back, killing the vigilante. For his actions, and the fact that Wilson was among those corrupted by Darkseid, Clark Kent/The Blur banished Wilson to the Phantom Zone. In the episode "Dominion", Wilson was returned to Earth months later by General Zod in a comatose state.
 Multiple characters have taken on the Deathstroke mantle in The CW's live-action Arrowverse, most notably being featured on Arrow.
 Bill "Billy" Wintergreen (portrayed by Jeffrey C. Robinson) is Slade Wilson's former friend and partner at the ASIS. He sides with Edward Fyers' mercenaries when they crash on the island, and Slade later stabs him in the right eye for his betrayal.
 Manu Bennett portrays Slade Wilson himself. He is introduced as an ASIS agent sent to extract ex-Chinese military member Yao Fei from the island of Lian Yu. Throughout the first and second seasons' flashbacks, Slade trains marooned playboy Oliver Queen while they are stranded together on the island, beginning Queen's path in becoming a vigilante. When Slade is mortally wounded in season 2, Oliver gives him the "mirakuru" supersoldier serum which saves his life and grants him superhuman physical attributes, though it also drives Slade insane and causes him to despise Oliver for the death of Shado by Dr. Ivo, whom Slade was in love with. Oliver is forced to drive an arrow through Slade's right eye in an attempt to kill him. In season two's present day narrative, Slade returns as the mercenary "Deathstroke" and wreaks havoc on Oliver's life, killing his mother and overwhelming Starling City with mirakuru-enhanced soldiers with aid from Sebastian Blood as his proxy and Isabel Rochev who has infiltered Queen Consolidated. Oliver ultimately manages to defeat and imprison Slade in an A.R.G.U.S. prison on Lian Yu. In the season three episode "The Return", Slade escapes his underground confinement and torments Oliver and his sister Thea during their training session on Lian Yu, though he is recaptured. Deathstroke is briefly seen in the season four episode "Genesis" as a vision, and reappears in the show's 100th episode as a Dominator-induced hallucination. Slade returns during the final two episodes of the fifth season, forming an alliance with Oliver against Prometheus. In the sixth season's episodes "Fallout", "Deathstroke Returns" and "Promises Kept", Slade tracks down his son Joe. In the eighth season during the series finale after the events of the Crisis on Infinite Earths crossover reset the multiverse, Oliver is revealed to have managed to prevent Slade from killing his mother, leaving Deathstroke's fate after being defeated uncertain in this new reality.
 Grant Wilson (portrayed by Jamie Andrew Cutler) takes up the Deathstroke mantle and continues his father's legacy. In the Legends of Tomorrow episode "Star City 2046", he is defeated by Connor Hawke and an older Oliver Queen. Grant reappears in the eighth season as the leader of the Deathstroke Gang.
 Joe Wilson (portrayed by Liam Hall) first appears as Slade's son in the episodes "Deathstroke Returns" and "Promises Kept" under the name Kane Wolfman. He later wears Deathstroke's suit during the crossover event "Elseworlds".
 John Diggle Jr. (portrayed by Charlie Barnett) appears in the seventh and eighth seasons. During flashforwards that take place in 2040, he replaces Grant Wilson as the leader of the Deathstroke Gang.

 Esai Morales portrays Slade Wilson/Deathstroke on the DC Universe web television series Titans. Introduced in season two, this version is a former member of the military organization H.I.V.E. who underwent an experiment that enhanced his physical abilities. Slade secretly began operating as the assassin "Deathstroke" upon being discharged, though his wife Adeline discovered this when their son Jericho was rendered mute by his enemies. After Adeline left him, Slade had a one-night stand with a prostitute and unintentionally impregnated her with a daughter named Rose, who inherited his regenerative healing. In 2014, Deathstroke killed Titans member Aqualad while attempting to fulfill a contract. Dick Grayson then revealed Slade's true nature to Jericho and recruited him to join the Titans. As Slade attempts to kill Dick for fracturing his relationship with his son, Jericho sacrifices himself to save Grayson before transferring his consciousness into Slade's body, inadvertently trapping himself within his father's mind. In the present day narrative, Slade comes out of retirement upon learning that Dick has assembled a new team of Titans, vowing to kill them for "destroying" his family. To tear the Titans apart, Slade plants Rose as a double agent within their ranks and briefly forms an alliance with Dr. Light. His plan ultimately fails as the Titans reunite and Rose defects to their side and impales Deathstroke in the chest, leaving his fate uncertain. He gets a mentioned by Hank Hall in the episode "Souls" when Hank unfavorably compares Jason Todd's Red Hood suit to Slade Wilson's suit.

Film

Live-action

Joe Manganiello portrays Slade Wilson/Deathstroke in the DC Extended Universe:
 The character first appears in the post-credits scene of Justice League (2017). After Lex Luthor escapes from Arkham Asylum, he recruits Slade Wilson to form their own league in response to Superman's resurrection and the formation of the Justice League. 
Deathstroke was also featured in Zack Snyder's director's cut of the film, Zack Snyder's Justice League (2021). Instead of recruiting him for a league, Lex reveals Batman's true identity to Slade. Slade also appears in Bruce Wayne's vision of the future where Darkseid has enslaved the Earth and corrupted Superman into being his minion. Slade has joined Batman's resistance force, and expresses disgust at the Joker also being a member.
 Deathstroke was originally slated to appear in the Batman solo film, The Batman, which was to star and be directed by Ben Affleck. Since Affleck's departure from the project, however, Matt Reeves was hired as director and re-wrote the script, terminating the DCEU connections of the film (and, by extension, Deathstroke's involvement in the film as well).
 Gareth Evans was in talks to write and direct a Deathstroke film in 2017, with Manganiello reprising the role of Deathstroke. Warner Bros. greenlit the film after Evans impressed executives with his story pitch, which he described as dark and unforgiving, similar to Korean noir films. However, in October 2018, Evans stated that he is yet to be attached to the project contractually. By April 2020, Evans announced that the project had been delayed, and that he was no longer actively involved with its development. The filmmaker revealed that the story that was developed was to portray the character's origin. In December 2020, after reprising the role in the Snyder Cut, Manganiello stated that there are ongoing projects involving the character being developed with Zack Snyder involved, noting that over the years, at least seven projects involving Deathstroke had been cancelled. In August 2021, concept art for The Suicide Squad revealed that Deathstroke was at one point in consideration to appear as the leader of "team two" of Task Force X. However he did not appear in the final cut of the film, with Bloodsport filling his role as the leader of the team.

Animation
 A parallel universe counterpart of Slade Wilson appears in Justice League: Crisis on Two Earths (2010), voiced by Bruce Davison. This version is the President of the United States in a world controlled by the Crime Syndicate of America, and wears an eyepatch on his left eye as opposed to his right.
 Deathstroke appears in Lego DC Comics Super Heroes: Justice League vs. Bizarro League (2015), voiced by John DiMaggio. Gorilla Grodd brainwashes him, Captain Cold, Giganta, and the Penguin into stealing bananas, but Cyborg breaks Grodd's mind-control helmet and all the brainwashed villains, including Deathstroke, take off. Plastic Man goes after Deathstroke while avoiding subway trains and eventually catches up to him, wrapping Deathstroke up.
 Deathstroke appears in Lego DC Comics Super Heroes: Justice League - Attack of the Legion of Doom (2015). He auditions to be part of the Legion of Doom. Deathstroke goes on the course after everyone else finishes, and he uses the traps to his advantage by using parkour moves. However, he is disqualified for destroying the course, as well as because Lex Luthor overheard Black Manta and Sinestro discussing about making Deathstroke the team's leader.
 Deathstroke appears in Lego DC Comics Super Heroes: Justice League: Gotham City Breakout (2016), voiced again by John DiMaggio. Once Batman's classmate in Madame Mantis' martial arts class, he quits after being jealous of Batman for being the star student. Madame Mantis used to call him "Strokedeath", a nickname which he despised. Deathstroke helps Bane take over a kingdom of humanoids called Trogowogs. When Batman is captured, he tries to get him to reveal how to do the "forbidden move" and eventually succeeds. He tries to use it on Batman, but stops himself in the middle of it, believing it to be too easy. Deathstroke then teams up with Batman to stop Bane, but an army of Trogowogs attacks them. They manage to fight them back until Batman gets the Trogowogs to dance. After Bane is defeated, Deathstroke departs, while claiming that he's returning to his supervillain ways.
 Deathstroke appears in Lego DC Comics Super Heroes: The Flash (2018). He pilots a helicopter to steal gold bars from a ship. Wonder Woman and Cyborg show up to stop him, but Reverse-Flash launches the helicopter into them. Deathstroke then prepares to fight, but Reverse-Flash builds a cage made out of gold bars around him, making Deathstroke the third villain captured by Reverse-Flash as part of his plot to win the public's adoration.
 A Feudal Japan version of Deathstroke appears in the anime film Batman Ninja (2018), voiced by Junichi Suwabe and Fred Tatasciore in Japanese and English respectively.
 Deathstroke (referred to as "Slade") appears as the main antagonist in Teen Titans Go! To the Movies (2018), voiced by Will Arnett. A recurring joke in the film involves the Teen Titans mistaking him for Deadpool, much to his annoyance. He plans to enslave the world's population via mind control, and steals various pieces of technology to build the D.O.O.M.S.D.A.Y. device to this end. To keep Earth's heroes distracted during the thefts, he masquerades as Jade Wilson (voiced by Kristen Bell) and produces films about them. He first meets the Titans while attempting to steal a crystal from S.T.A.R. Labs to power his device, and manages to overpower and insult them before escaping. Later, he attempts to infuse the stolen crystal's power at Wayne Tech, but the Titans again intervene and retrieve the crystal. Robin fights Deathstroke who is impressed by his skills and suggests that he could become his archenemy if he lets him escape, so that they could battle again in the future; he then proceeds to flee while Robin is distracted. As Jade, Slade manages to splinter the Titans by offering to give Robin his own film, and later tricks him into unlocking the Titans Tower's vault, where the crystal is kept. Slade then destroys the Tower and leaves Robin to die, but he survives and soon reconciles with the other Titans. Although Slade manages to mind-control most of the world's heroes and dispatches them to destroy the Titans, before trying to do so himself using a giant robot, the Titans defeat him and free everyone under his control using music.

DC Animated Movie Universe 
 Deathstroke appears in Justice League: The Flashpoint Paradox (2013), voiced again by Ron Perlman. In the alternate reality inadvertently created by the Flash, Deathstroke is the captain of a ship called The Ravager. He and Lex Luthor attempt to locate Aquaman's doomsday device, but are ambushed by Ocean Master and the Atlantean army. Deathstroke manages to cut through hordes of Atlanteans, overpowering both Garth and Kaldur'ahm, before being presumably killed by Black Manta's optic blasts. The Flash later alters the timeline once more and creates a new reality similar to the original.
 Deathstroke appears in Son of Batman (2014), voiced by Thomas Gibson. In the new reality created at the end of The Flashpoint Paradox, Slade Wilson is a former member of the League of Assassins who served as Ra's al Ghul's right-hand and future heir until his dishonorable actions deemed him unworthy. Feeling denied his right, Slade stages a coup d'état and kills his mentor though Damian Wayne manages to stab Slade's right eye. Now calling himself "Deathstroke", Slade forces Dr. Kirk Langstrom to genetically transform members of the League into Man-Bat ninja warriors. After capturing and severely wounding Talia al Ghul, Deathstroke is defeated by Batman and Robin while his underwater base is destroyed.
 Deathstroke returns in Teen Titans: The Judas Contract (2017), voiced by Miguel Ferrer in his final role. It is revealed that he survived the events of Son of Batman by rejuvenating himself in a Lazarus Pit. Deathstroke is contracted by Brother Blood to capture the Teen Titans, and plants his juvenile lover Terra as a double-agent within their ranks to do so. After failing to capture Titans member Nightwing, Deathstroke betrays Terra and offers her to Brother Blood instead. When the Titans manage to free themselves, Deathstroke engages Nightwing and Robin until the enraged Terra's powers brings down Brother Blood's underground lair, leaving Deathstroke's fate uncertain.
 Deathstroke makes a cameo appearance in Suicide Squad: Hell to Pay (2018). He is seen during a flashback where Bronze Tiger recalls his fiancée's murder, which Deathstroke carried out while still a member of the League of Assassins.

Video games
 Slade appears in the 2006 Teen Titans video game, voiced again by Ron Perlman. He serves as the game's final boss, and is an unlockable playable character.
 Deathstroke appears as a playable character in Mortal Kombat vs. DC Universe, played by Chris Matthews and voiced by Patrick Seitz. His ending has him forming a organization in his image, serving as Grand Master of this "DeathStrike Clan".
 Deathstroke appears in DC Universe Online, voiced by Tracy W. Bush.
 Deathstroke appears as a playable character in Injustice: Gods Among Us, voiced by J. G. Hertzler. The mainstream version is hired by Lex Luthor to break the Joker out of Arkham Asylum, and fights Batman who defeats him. The alternate reality version is a member of Batman's Insurgency, and is shown being tortured by Cyborg and Raven who are part of Superman's One Earth Regime, until he escapes while his captors are distracted by the mainstream Green Lantern. Later, Deathstroke teams up with the mainstream Cyborg to take over the Regime's Watchtower, and fights Shazam and the Flash. Afterwards, he is sent to retrieve some components for Luthor's kryptonite weapon and does so successfully, defeating Killer Frost and Wonder Woman in the process. In his non-canonical Arcade ending, following the Regime's downfall, Deathstroke recruits ex-Regime soldiers to form his own team of assassins, dubbed the "New Titans".
 Deathstroke appears as a summonable character in Scribblenauts Unmasked: A DC Comics Adventure.
 Deathstroke was added as an outfit in Fortnite following his appearance in the comic book limited series Batman/Fortnite: Zero Point.

Lego
 Deathstroke appears as a playable character in the Nintendo 3DS version of Lego Batman 2: DC Super Heroes.
 Deathstroke appears as a playable character in Lego Batman 3: Beyond Gotham, voiced by Liam O'Brien. Additionally, the Arrow and New 52 versions of Slade Wilson are playable via downloadable content.
 Deathstroke appears as a playable character in Lego DC Super-Villains, voiced again by Mark Rolston. He is depicted as being a member of, or at least allied with the League of Assassins. During the main story, he is recruited by Batman, the Joker and the Flash to help defeat the Crime Syndicate of America and Darkseid. The DCEU version of Deathstroke is also playable via downloadable content.

Batman: Arkham

 Deathstroke appears a boss in the mobile game Batman: Arkham City Lockdown (2011), voiced by Larry Grimm. He is hired by Hugo Strange to take out Batman, who defeats him and has him incarcerated at the Blackgate Penitentiary.
 Deathstroke is a boss in the prequel Batman: Arkham Origins (2013), voiced by Mark Rolston. He is one of the eight assassins hired by the Joker (posing as Black Mask) to kill Batman on Christmas Eve. Deathstroke battles Batman in the cargo hold of the Penguin's ship, and is ultimately defeated and arrested. Batman later comes across him while stopping the Joker's prison riot; remaining inside his cell, Deathstroke reveals that Joker refused to break him out, and that he has no interest in pursuing Batman anymore unless another bounty is available. In a post-credits scene, an imprisoned Deathstroke is visited by Amanda Waller, who offers to recruit him into her squad. The character is also playable via downloadable content, and has his own series of challenges.
 Deathstroke returns in Batman: Arkham Knight (2015), voiced again by Rolston. On Halloween night, he is hired by Scarecrow and the Arkham Knight to serve as a commander and advisor for their militia during their siege of Gotham City, and replaces the Knight as Scarecrow's second-in-command after Batman defeats the former. In the Most Wanted mission "Campaign for Disarmament", Batman uses the Batmobile to defuse the militia's encampments, attracting Deathstroke's attention, who eventually challenges Batman to fight his tank with the Batmobile. After destroying the tank, Batman subdues Deathstroke and takes him to the GCPD lockup to be incarcerated.

Merchandise
 Bandai has released several Slade figures based on his appearance in the Teen Titans animated series.
 Mattel has released several Deathstroke figures: A masked version and an unmasked variant in wave 3 of its DC Universe Classics series, a regular version and a chainlink armor variant in their DC Universe Infinite Heroes line, and a Deathstroke figure in their The Dark Knight movie line.
 DC Direct/DC Collectibles has released several Deathstroke figures: a classic version in their Contemporary Teen Titans line, an unmasked version in series 3 of their New Teen Titans line, an Injustice: Gods Among Us version (in a 2-pack with Green Arrow), a Son of Batman version based on the DC Universe animated movie, an Arrow version based on the second season of the TV show, and a Batman: Arkham Origins version based on the video game in an exclusive 4-pack (with Batman, the Joker and Black Mask).
 Funko has released several POP! vinyl figures of Deathstroke: a regular New 52 version, an unmasked New 52 version, a metallic New 52 version, a regular Arrow version, and an unmasked Arrow version.
 A Retro ReAction figure of Deathstroke has been released based on his appearance in the Arrow television series.
 A Lego Deathstroke minifig was released with Batman and Robin in a set featuring them in combatting boats. This set was packaged with a comic.
 XM Studios produced a 1:4 scale, hand painted, cold-cast porcelain Deathstroke statue as part of its Samurai Series. It is also a part of its DC Premium Collectibles series.

Miscellaneous
 Slade was seen in Teen Titans Go! #16. His daughter Rose also made an appearance in #49, as the Ravager. A painting of Slade, without his mask, is briefly seen in the comic book.
 In the Robot Chicken DC Comics Special, Deathstroke is seen with various other supervillains inside the Trojan cake as they are about to attack the Justice League.

References

External links

 Deathstroke at DC Comics' official website
 Deathstroke at the DC Database Project
 

Action film villains
Villains in animated television series
Batman characters
Characters created by George Pérez
Characters created by Marv Wolfman
Comics characters introduced in 1980
DC Comics characters who can move at superhuman speeds
DC Comics characters who have mental powers
DC Comics characters with accelerated healing
DC Comics characters with superhuman senses
DC Comics characters with superhuman strength
DC Comics film characters
DC Comics male supervillains
DC Comics martial artists
DC Comics metahumans
DC Comics military personnel
DC Comics television characters
Fictional assassins in comics
Fictional bounty hunters
Fictional contract killers
Fictional characters missing an eye
Fictional characters who have made pacts with devils
Fictional characters with eidetic memory
Fictional characters with slowed ageing
Fictional gunfighters in comics
Fictional Korean War veterans
Fictional marksmen and snipers
Fictional mass murderers
Fictional mercenaries in comics
Fictional ninja
Fictional super soldiers
Fictional swordfighters in comics
Fictional torturers
Fictional United States Army personnel
Fictional Vietnam War veterans
Fighting game characters
Suicide Squad members
Supervillains with their own comic book titles
Video game bosses